The Olivetti Research Laboratory (ORL) was a research institute in the field of computing and telecommunications founded in 1986 by Hermann Hauser and Andy Hopper.

History
When Olivetti acquired Acorn Computers in 1985, Hauser, who was Acorn's co-founder, became vice-president for research at Olivetti where he was in charge of laboratories in the US and Europe. In 1986, Hauser co-founded the Olivetti Research Laboratory (ORL) in Cambridge, England, along with Professor Andy Hopper. Hopper became the laboratory's Director.

In 1988, Hauser left Olivetti. In 1997 the lab became the Olivetti & Oracle Research Lab. In January 1999 it was acquired by AT&T Corporation and became AT&T Laboratories Cambridge.

AT&T Laboratories Cambridge was for three years Europe's leading communications engineering research laboratory. The laboratory was internationally recognised as a centre of excellence, undertaking advanced research into communications, multimedia and mobile technologies.

As a result of heavy losses, AT&T restructured its worldwide research efforts and the Cambridge labs closed on 24 April 2002.

Notable achievements

 Original development of the RFB (remote framebuffer) protocol and VNC, the desktop sharing technology
 Development and maintenance of the free CORBA implementation for C++ and Python, omniORB
 The Active Badge System for the tracking of people and objects

External links 
Wrangling money men shut down the future, The Observer, 21 April 2002.
 An archive of many of the lab's technical reports
 XORL - an 'alumni' site formed at the lab's closure, with information about people and projects.

Defunct technological companies of the United Kingdom
Companies based in Cambridge
Research institutes established in 1986
Research institutes in Cambridge
Companies disestablished in 2002